Georgi Ivanovich Burkov (31 May 1933 – 19 July 1990) was a Soviet and Russian film actor. He appeared in 70 films between 1967 and 1988. He died on 19 July 1990 at the age of 57 due to thrombosis.

Selected filmography
 Zigzag of Success (1968) as Pyotr
 Liberation (Освобождение, 1970) as sergeant
 Grandads-Robbers (Старики-разбойники, 1971) as Fyodor Fedyaev
 They Fought for Their Country (Они сражались за Родину, 1975) as Alexandr Kopytovskij
 The Irony of Fate (Ирония судьбы, или С лёгким паром!, 1975) as Misha
 Wounded Game (Подранки, 1977) as Sergei Pogartsev
 Office Romance (Служебный роман, 1977) as logistical manager
 The Nose (Нос, 1977) as quarterly warden
 Father Sergius (Отец Сергий, 1978) as merchant
 The Garage (Гараж, 1979) as Vitaly Fetisov
 Takeoff (Взлёт, 1979) as Rokotov
 Kind Men (Добряки, 1979) as Kabachkov
 Bag of the Collector (Сумка инкассатора, 1979) as Alexander Sanin
 The Old New Year (Старый Новый год, 1980) as Pyotr Sebeykin's father-in-law
 Say a Word for the Poor Hussar (О бедном гусаре замолвите слово…, 1981) as Artyuhov
 Vasily and Vasilisa (Василий и Василиса, 1981) as narrator
 Once Upon a Dog (Жил-был пёс, 1982) as dog
 Guest from the Future (Гостья из будущего, 1985) as doctor Alik Borisovich
 Boris Godunov (Борис Годунов, 1986) as Varlaam
 Yolki-palki (Ёлки-палки!, 1988) as chief of the police station
 The Cat Who Walked by Herself (Кошка, которая гуляла сама по себе, 1988) as man, dog

References

External links

1933 births
1990 deaths
Actors from Perm, Russia
Soviet male film actors
Soviet male voice actors
Perm State University alumni
Deaths from thrombosis
Honored Artists of the RSFSR
Burials at Vagankovo Cemetery